Dame Patricia Collarbone DBE, FRSA (born July 1947) is a British educationist, writer and speaker she was the founding director of the London Leadership Centre and of Creating Tomorrow Ltd a consultancy focused on leadership development and delivering self sustaining change programmes. She was made a Dame Commander of the Order of the British Empire in 1997 for services to Education.

In 2004 she was asked by the Labour Government to lead a major workforce modernisation programme in all 22,000 schools in England. The success of the project led to her being asked to manage further system wide changes such as Every Child Matters. She has held the post of Director of Leadership programmes at the National College of School Leadership, Executive director of the National Remodelling Team  and a director at the Training and Development  Agency.

During her consultancy and advisory career she has advised a range of organisations both in the UK and overseas notably leading the development of the Principal Standard in Australia.

She is a fellow of the Royal Society of Arts. She has been a visiting professor at Canterbury Christ Church University and a visiting fellow at the Institute of Education.

Education and early career
Collarbone was educated at Spalding high school for girls followed by a Teacher Training course at  College of All Saints Tottenham, London. She then went onto complete a BA Hons at Middlesex Polytechnic in the Sociology of Education. In 1995 she completed an MBA in Education at  Leeds Metropolitan University and in 1999 completed her Doctorate on Educational leadership at the University of Humberside and Lincolnshire.

In 1968 she began her teaching career at Haggerston school in the London Borough of Hackney where, having held a number of positions of responsibility, she became Headteacher in 1990 until December 1996.

Government advisor
Collarbone served as  a member of the Department for Education and Employment's advisory committee from 1997. She was a member of  Hackney school Improvement Team, appointed by Secretary of State in 1997/8.

In 1998 she was appointed as a Special  Advisor to the 9th Education Government Select Committee investigating the role of Headteacher.In the same year she was appointed as a Special Advisor to the Department for Education and Science on headship and leadership aspects linked to the 1998 Green Paper Teachers Meeting the Challenge of Change (1998-2001). In 1999 she led the review of the leadership programme for serving headteachers NPQH.

In 1999 she was included in Good Housekeepings’ 100 most influential women in Britain.

In 2007 she chaired The Care Matters working group for DfES producing the Best Practice in Schools Paper to help inform the Care matters: Time for Change White Paper.

London Leadership Centre
In 1996 Collarbone established the London Leadership Centre at Institute of Education UCL Institute of Education, University of London and in January 1997 she took up the post of Founding Director.

She led the development of the National Professional Qualification for Headteachers between 1999 and 2001. A move away from a competence model, which places emphasis on minimum standards outputs, to a competency-based approach described as what ‘a successful person characteristically brings to a specified task or role’. She has since advised a number of countries in the development of standards.

2002/3 she directed the London Leadership Centre consortium which managed the Transforming the School workforce Pathfinder on behalf of the DES. The success of this led to her being asked to be the Director of the National Remodelling Team (NRT)in 2003, a three-year programme to transform the way school staff work. Each school developed a "change team" to help introduce new ideas. Ofsted in a review of the these initiatives “found that the reforms have resulted in a revolutionary shift in the culture of the school workforce”.

National College for School Leadership 
Between 2002- 2005 Collarbone was seconded to The National College for School Leadership as Director of Leadership Programmes where she led the development and delivery  of a portfolio of leadership programmes including the Leadership programme for Serving Headteachers,  Middle Management, Governors and Executive Leaders.

Training and Development Agency for Schools 
In 2005-6 together with the NRT she transferred as a director to the Training and Development Agency for schools.  The success of the workforce reform led to  a significant role in the leadership of change for NRT in a range of national initiatives linked to the Every Child Matters agenda.

Consultancy roles

Education Change Associates 
In 2006 she set up Education Change Associates Ltd a private consultancy firm. She advised on the design of a  professional qualification for educational leaders in the Cayman Islands  and advised the Thai ministry contributing to the development of a leadership development framework.

In 2007-2008 she led a Remodelling, Change and Leadership project with FE sector.  The first   phase was with 10 colleges, where transference of the change process and skills to FE sector colleagues was completed.

Creating Tomorrow Ltd 
In 2008 she cofounded Creating Tomorrow Ltd a consultancy with the specific aim of developing cost effective and sustainable change programmes that any organisation could use.

In 2010 she led an intensive and collaborative process to develop the Australian Professional Standard for Principals involving over 550 stakeholders as well as national and international research. The standard provides a framework for what principals should know, understand and do to succeed as a school leader. The success of this led her to be asked to develop leadership profiles - actions that can be implemented depending upon context, career stage and capabilities.

She developed a set of programs based around a proven change process that included diagnostics, facilitation training, train the trainer, leadership coaching, system change and quality control which she delivered in the UK, Australia, the Netherlands and the US.  

She closed Creating Tomorrow in 2018 to concentrate on her charitable interests sitting on a number of educational trusts.

Honours
In 1998 Collarbone was made a Dame Commander of the Order of the British Empire the equivalent of a knighthood for women for services to education.

In March 2006 she was appointed Visiting Professor in Faculty of Education at Christ Church Canterbury University.

Publications

Books 
Collarbone, P. (1987) Lower School Humanities. Geography Schools Industry Project, Oxford University.

Collarbone, P., Connolly, J., Scriviner, C. and Westaway, J. (1988) Urban Patterns and Processes Heinemann Geographical Association Award Winner, best publication of the year.

Collarbone, P., Connolly, J., Scriviner, C. and Westaway, J. (19981988) Heinemann Rural Urban Links.

Barber M., Collarbone P., Cullen E., Owen PD. (1994) Keele University Two Towns Project Evaluation Report.

Collarbone, P. (1996) A Journey of a 1,000  Miles – the Haggerston Journey. A chapter in Reengineering and Total Quality in Schools, Editors: Davies B. and West-Burnham J.

Stoll, L., Bolam, R. and Collarbone, P. (2002). Leading for Cange: Building Capacity for Learning. A chapter in the International Handbook of Educational Leadership and Administration (Section editor: Phil Hallinger).

Collarbone, P. and West-Burnham, J., (2008). Understanding Systems Leadership: Securing excellence and equity in education. London: Network Continuum

Collarbone, P., (2009) Creating tomorrow: Planning, developing and sustaining change in education and other public services. London: Network Continuum

Collarbone,P. and Edkins, S. (2013) Autonomy and Professional Courage: Emotional and Political Aspects of Change. A chapter in Sustainable School Transformation: An Inside-Out School Lead Approach. Edited by David Crossley: Bloomsbury

Collarbone,P. and Edkins,S. (2021) Change @ Work: A proven process that addresses the rational, emotional and political challenges of creating a better tomorrow. Kindle Direct Publishing

Papers and presentations 
Collarbone, P. (1997) The Lead Learner. London Regional News.

Various articles in Leading Edge (1997 to 2002), the Journal of the London Leadership Centre.

Billingham, M. and Collarbone, P. (1998) Research Matters: Leadership and Our Schools in Research Matters.

Collarbone, P. (1998) Dolphin or Dodo: A note for LEAs. Education Review. Volume 12, No. 1.

Collarbone, P. (1999) Schools of the Future and their Leadership: A Blueprint for Success. An RSA lecture. Collarbone P. Volume 3, Number 1.

Collarbone, P. and Shaw. R. (1999) The National College for School Leadership. Head of Review, NAHT.

Collarbone, P. (1999) Education in the United Kingdom: Issues for Headteachers. Hot Topics, Australian Council for Educational Illumination.

Collarbone, P. (2001) Leadership Programme for Serving Headteachers: A Review. Nottingham: National College for School Leadership.

Collarbone, P. (2001). The Governing Body and NPQH. In Governors’ Agenda, Issue Number 19, Coventry: CEDC

Halpin, D., Collarbone, P., Earley, P., Evans, J. and Gold A., (2002) Conducting online focus groups in research on school leadership: a methodological discussion. For publication in the BELMAS magazine “Management in Education”.

Collarbone, P., Earley, P., Evans, J., Gold A. and Halpin, D., (2002). The Current State of School Leadership in England. A research paper commissioned by the DfES.

Collarbone, P., Earley, P., Evans, J., Gold A. and Halpin, D., Values-driven Leadership in Education: Evidence from Ten Case Studies of “Outstanding” School Principals. A paper to be presented at the Annual Meeting of the American Educational Research Association, April, 2002.

Collarbone, P. and Southworth, G., (2004). Learning to Lead: NCSL’s Strategy for Leadership Learning. Nottingham: National College for School Leadership

Collarbone, P., (2005). Remodelling Leadership. An address to the North of England Conference

Collarbone, P., (2005). “Touching Tomorrow: Remodelling in English Schools” in The Australian Economic Review, Vol 38, No 1. Melbourne: Blackwell Publishing

Collarbone, P. (2005) Shaping the future - Leading Personalised Learning in Schools - Helping individuals grow

Collarbone, P., (2005). Education 2010: A World of Difference. The Annual Lecture at the Institute of Education, Manchester Metropolitan University.

Collarbone, P., (2006). Learning and Teaching in 2020. Paper prepared for the DfES

Collarbone, P., (2006). The School Workforce in 2020. Paper prepared for the DfES

Collarbone, P. (Chair), (2007). Best Practice in Schools. Nottingham: DfES Publications

Collarbone, P. (2012) Leading Change, Changing Leadership Part 1 Centre for Strategic Education Occasional Papers

Dinham,S. Collarbone, P. Evans,M. Mackay, A. (2013) The Development, Endorsement and Adoption of a National Standard for Principals in Australia. Educational Management Administration & Leadership, vol. 38, 5: pp. 644–646

Collarbone, P. (2015) Leading Change, Changing Leadership Part 2 Centre for Strategic Education Occasional Papers

References 

1947 births
Living people
Heads of schools in London
Academics of the UCL Institute of Education
Dames Commander of the Order of the British Empire
Date of birth missing (living people)
People from Kings Langley
Place of birth missing (living people)